The 1956 international cricket season was from April 1956 to August 1956.

Season overview

June

Australia in England

July

Netherlands in Denmark

August

England in Netherlands

References

1956 in cricket